The year 1831 in science and technology involved some significant events, listed below.

Astronomy
 January 7 – Great Comet of 1831 (C/1831 A1, 1830 II) first observed by John Herapath.
 March 7 – Royal Astronomical Society receives its Royal Charter.
 Heinrich Schwabe makes the first detailed drawing of the Great Red Spot on Jupiter.
 Mary Somerville translates Laplace's Mécanique céleste as The Mechanism of the Heavens.

Biology
 September 1 – Zoological Gardens, Dublin, open in Ireland.
 Robert Brown found the cell nucleus.

Chemistry
 A. A. Bussy publishes his Mémoire sur le Radical métallique de la Magnésie  describing his method of isolating magnesium.
 The Kaliapparat, a laboratory device for the analysis of carbon in organic compounds, is invented by Justus von Liebig.

Exploration
 June 1 – British Royal Navy officer James Clark Ross locates the position of the North Magnetic Pole on the Boothia Peninsula.

Medicine
 May 16 – Middlesex County Asylum for pauper lunatics opens at Hanwell near London under the humane superintendence of William Charles Ellis.
 Dr C. Turner Thackrah publishes The Effects of the Principal Arts, Trades, and Professions, and of Civic States and Habits of Living, on Health and Longevity, with a particular reference to the trades and manufactures of Leeds, and suggestions for the removal of many of the agents which produce disease and shorten the duration of life, a pioneering study of occupational and public health in a newly industrialised English city.

Paleontology
 Henry Witham publishes Observations on fossil vegetables, accompanied by representations of their internal structure, as seen through the microscope in Edinburgh.

Technology
 April 12 – Broughton Suspension Bridge over the River Irwell in England collapses under marching troops.
 August 29 – Michael Faraday demonstrates electromagnetic induction at the Royal Society of London. Joseph Henry recognises it at about the same time.
 October 28 – Faraday develops the Faraday Wheel, a homopolar generator.
 Joseph Henry invents the electric bell.
 James Meadows Rendel erects the first bascule bridge with a hydraulic mechanism, on the Kingsbridge Estuary in England.
 William Wallace invents the eidograph.

Institutions
 September 27 – British Association for the Advancement of Science first meets, in York.

Awards
 Copley Medal: George Biddell Airy
 Wollaston Medal (first award): William Smith

Births
 January 20 – Edward Routh (died 1907), Canadian-born English mathematician.
 January 26 – Heinrich Anton de Bary (died 1888), German surgeon, botanist, microbiologist and mycologist.
 February 28 – Edward James Stone (died 1897), English astronomer.
 March 3 – George Pullman (died 1897), American inventor.
 May 16 – David E. Hughes (died 1900), British inventor.
 June 13 – James Clerk Maxwell (died 1879), Scottish-born mathematician.
 August 20 – Eduard Suess (died 1914), Austrian geologist.
 October 6 – Richard Dedekind (died 1916), German mathematician.
 October 15 – Isabella Bird (died 1904), English explorer, writer, photographer and naturalist.
 October 21 – Hermann Hellriegel (died 1895), German agricultural chemist, discoverer of the mechanism by which leguminous plants assimilate the free nitrogen of the atmosphere.
 October 29 – Othniel Charles Marsh (died 1899), American paleontologist.

Deaths
 February 14 – Henry Maudslay (born 1771), English mechanical engineer.
 March 26 - Pierre Amable Jean-Baptiste Trannoy (born 1772),  French physician, hygienist and botanist.
 June 27 – Sophie Germain (born 1776), French mathematician.
 October 14 – Jean-Louis Pons (born 1761, French astronomer.
 December 22 – François Huber (born 1750), blind Swiss naturalist.

References

 
19th century in science
1830s in science